One Emotion is the fifth studio album by American country music singer-songwriter Clint Black, released on October 4, 1994. Its five singles reached the heights of the Billboard Hot Country Songs charts: "Untanglin' My Mind" at #4, "Wherever You Go" at #3, "Summer's Comin'" at #1, the title track at #2 and "Life Gets Away" at #4.

Among the album's collaborations are the songs "Untanglin' My Mind", co-written with the country legend Merle Haggard, and "You Made Me Feel", co-written with the soul singer Michael McDonald.

One Emotion was a commercial success, becoming Black's fifth consecutive album to be certified at least platinum by the RIAA.

Track listing

Personnel

Band
Clint Black - acoustic guitar, electric guitar, harmonica, lead vocals, background vocals, 12-string guitar
Hayden Nicholas - acoustic guitar, electric guitar, electric sitar, baritone guitar
Eddie Bayers - drums
Dane Bryant - piano
Thom Flora - background vocals
Dick Gay - drums
Aubrey Haynie - fiddle
Dann Huff - electric guitar
Brent Mason - electric guitar
Jeff Peterson - dobro, acoustic guitar, steel guitar, melobar
John Wesley Ryles - background vocals
Biff Watson - acoustic guitar
Jake Willemain - bass guitar
Glenn Worf - bass guitar
Curtis Young - background vocals
Martin Young - acoustic guitar

Production
Clint Black - producer
James Stroud - producer
Zack Berry - production assistant
Ricky Cobble - assistant engineer
Mark Hagen - assistant engineer, mixing assistant
Julian King - engineer
Glenn Meadows - mastering
Lynn Peterzell - engineer, mixing
Doug Rich - production assistant

Charts

Weekly charts

Year-end charts

Singles

References

[ One Emotion Overview]. Allmusic. Retrieved on January 1, 2007.
[ One Emotion Credits]. Allmusic. Retrieved on January 5, 2007.
[ Artist Chart History (Singles)]. Billboard. Retrieved on January 1, 2007.
[ Artist Chart History (Albums)]. Billboard. Retrieved on January 1, 2007.

1994 albums
Clint Black albums
RCA Records albums
Albums produced by James Stroud
Albums produced by Clint Black